Koncert is a Yugoslav film directed by Branko Belan.

 It was released in 1954. Oktavijan Miletić was the cinematographer for the film.

References

External links
 

1954 films
Croatian war drama films
1950s Croatian-language films
Yugoslav war drama films
Jadran Film films
1954 directorial debut films
Yugoslav black-and-white films